Les Marins perdus is a 2003 French film based on a novel by Jean-Claude Izzo. It was written and directed by Claire Devers.

Cast
 Bernard Giraudeau : Diamantis
 Miki Manojlović : Abdul Aziz 
 Sergio Peris-Mencheta : Nedim
 Marie Trintignant : Mariette
 Audrey Tautou : Lalla
 Nozha Khouadra : Gaby
 Darry Cowl : Falco
 Bakary Sangaré : Ousbène
 Ivan Franěk : The Moroccan
 Miglen Mirtchev : Subotica
 Maryline Even : Gisèle
 Moussa Maaskri : Sergio
 Amina Annabi : Amina
 Bernard Verley : Mariette's father

External links

2003 films
2003 drama films
French drama films
Films directed by Claire Devers
Seafaring films
Films set in Marseille
2000s French films